Eupoca is a genus of moths of the family Crambidae.

Species
Eupoca bifascialis 
Eupoca chicalis (Schaus, 1920)
Eupoca definita 
Eupoca haakei Solis & Adamski, 1998
Eupoca leucolepia 
Eupoca micralis 
Eupoca polyorma 
Eupoca sanctalis

References

Glaphyriinae
Crambidae genera
Taxa named by William Warren (entomologist)